Arvid Mauritz Lindström (26 April 1849 – 11 December 1923) was a Swedish painter. Lindström is best known today for his atmospheric landscapes.

Biography
He was born in the parish of Björksta in Västmanland, Sweden. His parents were Per Fredrik Lindström and Hedvig Ringström.
He studied at the Royal Swedish Academy of Arts in Stockholm  in 1869–1872. He went to Munich and Paris to continue his studies.  
In 1877 Lindström became an apprentice (agré)  at the Royal Swedish Academy of Fine Arts  and in 1886 he joined the Art Association.
He lived in England, mainly in London, from the early 1880s to 1889.

Selected paintings

References

Other sources
 Mauritz Lindström, Nordisk familjebok

External links
Selected art works 

1849 births
1923 deaths
Swedish landscape painters
People from Västmanland
19th-century Swedish painters
Swedish male painters
20th-century Swedish painters
19th-century Swedish male artists
20th-century Swedish male artists